Pescadero (Spanish for "Fishmonger") is an unincorporated town and census-designated place (CDP) in San Mateo County, California, two miles (3 km) east of State Route 1 and Pescadero State Beach. The ZIP Code is 94060 and the community is inside area code 650. The population was 595 at the 2020 census.

About

Pescadero is a farming and ranching community near the Pescadero Marsh, a wildlife refuge. Pescadero Creek, the longest stream in San Mateo County, is an annual creek that empties into the Pacific Ocean near the town. Many of the buildings in town date from the 19th century.

Pescadero is also a weekend tourist destination during the summer months because of beaches, parks including Memorial Park and Butano State Park, Pigeon Point Lighthouse and Hostel, as well as extensive rural roads for biking and trails for hiking in the Santa Cruz Mountains. Attractions include Duarte's Tavern, Arcangeli Grocery Co. (Norm's Market / Bakery), Sante Family Wines, Made in Pescadero (a furniture store), Downtown Local (a coffee shop), The Sunshine (a boutique grocery store), Pescadero Essentials (a health/beauty shop), South Coast Children's Services Thrift Shop, Luna Sea art gallery, the Pie Ranch Farmstand, the Pescadero Farmers Market (that runs from June through October), and Taqueria y Mercado de Amigos, an acclaimed taqueria in the local gas station.

Pescadero is host to a number of successful agricultural ventures, some of which offer high-quality produce and value-added products throughout San Mateo County and much of the Bay Area. These include: Harley Farms Goat Dairy, Blue House Farm, Tomkat Ranch,  Simms Organic, Fifth Crow Farm, R & R Herbs, and many others.

Pescadero hosts the annual Pescadero Art and Fun Fair (PAFF) on the third weekend of August. The Alto Velo Bicycle Racing Club holds the annual Pescadero Coastal Classic Road Race, which travels through the town and nearby countryside, in early- to mid-June.

The town is home to Pescadero Middle and High School, established in 1922. The Pescadero High School and Middle School teams are the Vikings and the Panthers, respectively. Pescadero Elementary School is located north of downtown.

Non-profits in Pescadero play a central role in much of the town's economy and the well-being of its residents. Puente de la Costa Sur serves as the only resource community center in this region of San Mateo County, providing valuable aid to farmworkers and community members alike. Educational organizations such as Pie Ranch work with the state to generate land access opportunities for impoverished communities, and stimulate regenerative agriculture initiatives.

KPDO, at 89.3 FM, is Pescadero's community radio station.

Pescadero Marsh 

Located at the confluence of Pescadero Creek and Butano Creek, the area known as Pescadero Marsh has for decades been a thriving habitat for both migratory and native wildlife. Besides being a refuge and nesting ground for wintering waterfowl, the Marsh is a critical spawning area and nursery for coho salmon, steelhead trout, tidewater goby, and many other threatened or endangered fish, amphibian, and reptile species.

Due to many causes, both natural and man-made, the health of Pescadero Marsh is deteriorating rapidly. Anoxic water conditions result in annual "die-offs" of hundreds of juvenile fish, crabs, and other species. As water levels fluctuate, many species are cut off from supportive habitat, and the entire eco-system degrades.

Since 1998 concerned citizens and other wildlife agencies have repeatedly asked California State Parks to take immediate corrective action. The Parks department has moved to request further studies. Meanwhile, native species populations in the marsh have reached critically low levels. According to a study by Dr. Jerry Smith, San Jose State Professor, estimates in 1985 showed that 10,000 steelhead were rearing in the lagoon. As of 2008, 750 steelhead were counted in the same area.

Attractions

Nature

Farms and dairies

Buildings 
 Dickerman Barn, a surviving dairy barn built for the Steele Brothers Dairy Ranch, located in the Año Nuevo State Park, and one of the National Register of Historic Places.
 First Congregational Church of Pescadero, a California Historical Landmark that is also on the National Register of Historic Places.
 Pigeon Point Lighthouse, located near Pescadero.

Geography 

Demographics
The 2010 United States Census reported that Pescadero had a population of 643. The racial makeup of Pescadero was 314 (48.8%) White, 2 (0.3%) African American, 2 (0.3%) Native American, 5 (0.8%) Asian, 1 (0.2%) Pacific Islander, 294 (45.7%) from other races, and 25 (3.9%) from two or more races. Hispanic or Latino of any race were 402 persons (62.5%). 

The Census reported that 624 people (97.0% of the population) lived in households, 19 (3.0%) lived in non-institutionalized group quarters, and 0 (0%) were institutionalized. There were 195 households, out of which 82 (42.1%) had children under the age of 18 living in them, 98 (50.3%) were opposite-sex married couples living together, 23 (11.8%) had a female householder with no husband present, 16 (8.2%) had a male householder with no wife present.  There were 17 (8.7%) unmarried opposite-sex partnerships, and 3 (1.5%) same-sex married couples or partnerships. 41 households (21.0%) were made up of individuals, and 8 (4.1%) had someone living alone who was 65 years of age or older. The average household size was 3.20.  There were 137 families (70.3% of all households); the average family size was 3.75.

The population was spread out, with 179 people (27.8%) under the age of 18, 58 people (9.0%) aged 18 to 24, 197 people (30.6%) aged 25 to 44, 130 people (20.2%) aged 45 to 64, and 79 people (12.3%) who were 65 years of age or older.  The median age was 33.5 years. For every 100 females, there were 110.1 males.  For every 100 females age 18 and over, there were 123.1 males.

The homeowner vacancy rate was 2.3%; the rental vacancy rate was 4.4%.  205 people (31.9% of the population) lived in owner-occupied housing units and 419 people (65.2%) lived in rental housing units.

Weather

Pescadero has cool, wet winters and mild, mostly dry summers. Fog and low overcast are common throughout the year, particularly during the summer months. Strong winds sometimes blow off the nearby Pacific Ocean. Winter temperatures seldom drop below freezing, and summer temperatures rarely exceed . 

The nearest National Weather Service cooperative weather station is in the nearby village of San Gregorio, north of Pescadero on Stage Road.

History 

The town of Pescadero is located on the Rancho Pescadero Mexican land grant; former Mission Santa Cruz pasture given to Juan José Gonzalez in 1833. Alexander Moore (1823–1902), an American pioneer, built his home in Pescadero Valley in 1853. The rich, fertile soil of the valley had attracted other settlers, and in the 1860s Pescadero was a prosperous town surrounded by farms and lumber mills.

According to a guidebook published by the California Coastal Commission, the residents of Pescadero recovered a large quantity of white paint from the 1853 wreck of the clipper ship Carrier Pigeon at Pigeon Point. The paint was "used liberally on all the town's buildings", and residents have since maintained the tradition of painting their houses white. However, other sources credit the 1896 wreck of the steamer Columbia as the source of the white paint.

An article in the Wells Fargo Messenger states that a stagecoach salvaged from the Carrier Pigeon was laboriously hoisted up the cliffs onto the road, and put into service within a week. The coach, built in Concord, New Hampshire, carried passengers and freight on the Pescadero road for the Wells Fargo Company for forty years, and, in 1914, was listed among the company's prized possessions.

Another tale relates that an Irishman named John Daly, who was employed driving pigs from Santa Cruz to Alexander Moore's Pescadero ranch, discovered some lumps of coal from the steamer Sea Bird'''s cargo on the beach at Ano Nuevo. Mr. Daly endeavored to parley his discovery into money which he might spend on whiskey. Since coal deposits had been rumored to exist in the area, Mr. Daly proceeded with his lumps of coal to Santa Cruz, announcing to Captain Brannan and three others that he had discovered a coal mine at Gazos Creek. After collecting his monetary reward, he led the four men up Gazos Creek in search of the alleged coal outcropping, with the intention of escaping and leaving his benefactors behind empty-handed. However, Captain Brannan, who was armed, managed to capture Daly and extracted a confession. Daly was administered a whipping on the spot and later fled the area.

Notable people

 Steve Blank (born 1953), entrepreneur and academician
 Jessica Dubroff (1988–1996), 7-year-old pilot trainee who was killed in a plane crash
 Gordon Moore (born 1929), cofounder and chairman emeritus of Intel Corporation, and the author of Moore's law, grew up in Pescadero and resided there until he was about 10 years of age. His childhood home still stands as does the barn he played in (Pescadero Creekside Barn).
Heinz von Foerster (1911–2002), scientist and cybernetician lived on an estate in the Pescadero hills called "Rattlesnake Hill" until his death in 2002.

See alsoCarrier Pigeon'', clipper ship that wrecked near the town in 1853

References

External links

 Pescadero State Beach

Populated coastal places in California
Census-designated places in San Mateo County, California
Census-designated places in California